In enzymology, a maleylacetate reductase is an enzyme that catalyzes the chemical reaction

3-oxoadipate + NAD(P)+  2-maleylacetate + NAD(P)H + H+

The 3 substrates of this enzyme are 3-oxoadipate, NAD+, and NADP+, whereas its 4 products are 2-maleylacetate, NADH, NADPH, and H+.

This enzyme belongs to the family of oxidoreductases, specifically those acting on the CH-CH group of donor with NAD+ or NADP+ as acceptor.  The systematic name of this enzyme class is 3-oxoadipate:NAD(P)+ oxidoreductase. This enzyme is also called maleolylacetate reductase.  This enzyme participates in 3 metabolic pathways: gamma-hexachlorocyclohexane degradation, benzoate degradation via hydroxylation, and 1,4-dichlorobenzene degradation.

References

 
 

EC 1.3.1
NADPH-dependent enzymes
NADH-dependent enzymes
Enzymes of unknown structure